The 1974 Atlanta Braves season was the ninth season in Atlanta along with the 104th season as a franchise overall. The team finished third in the National League West with a record of 88–74, 14 games behind the Los Angeles Dodgers. During the season, Braves outfielder Hank Aaron became the all-time career leader in home runs, surpassing Babe Ruth.  Ralph Garr was the league's batting champion with a .353 average. Pitcher Buzz Capra captured the ERA title (2.28) and Phil Niekro tied for the league lead in wins with 20.

Offseason

Waiting for a new home run king 
At the end of the 1973 season, Aaron had finished one home run short of the record. He hit home run number 713 on September 29, 1973, and with one day remaining in the season, many expected him to tie the record. But in his final game that year, playing against the Houston Astros (led by manager Leo Durocher, who had once roomed with Babe Ruth), he was unable to hit one out of the park.

Over the winter, Aaron received many death threats and a large assortment of hate mail. Many did not want to see a black man break Ruth's nearly sacrosanct home run record. Lewis Grizzard, then editor of the Atlanta Journal, prepared for the massive coverage of the home run record. Secretly though, he quietly had an obituary written, scared that Aaron might be murdered.

Sports Illustrated pointedly summarized the racist vitriol that Aaron was forced to endure:

"Is this to be the year in which Aaron, at the age of thirty-nine, takes a moon walk above one of the most hallowed individual records in American sport...? Or will it be remembered as the season in which Aaron, the most dignified of athletes, was besieged with hate mail and trapped by the cobwebs and goblins that lurk in baseball's attic?"

Babe Ruth's widow, Claire Hodgson, even denounced the racism and declared that her husband would have enthusiastically cheered Aaron's attempt at the record.

Notable transactions 
 January 9, 1974: Mike Davey was drafted by the Braves in the 2nd round of the 1974 Major League Baseball Draft (Secondary Phase).
 March 26, 1974: Buzz Capra was purchased by the Braves from the New York Mets.

Regular season

Hank Aaron's 715th 

As the 1974 season began, the Braves opened the season on the road with a three-game series against the Cincinnati Reds. Braves management wanted him to break the record in Atlanta, so the plan was to have Aaron sit for said games against the Reds. Baseball Commissioner Bowie Kuhn ruled that he had to play two games in the first series. He played two out of three, tying Babe Ruth's record in his very first at bat off Reds pitcher Jack Billingham, but failed to hit another home run in the series.

The team returned to Atlanta for a series with the Los Angeles Dodgers. On April 8, 1974, a crowd of 53,775 people showed up for the game — a Braves attendance record. Sammy Davis Jr. was in attendance, and Pearl Bailey sang the national anthem in Broadway soul.  Atlanta's black mayor, Maynard Jackson, and Georgia Governor Jimmy Carter attended the game.

Dodgers pitcher Al Downing had walked Aaron leading off the second inning to the accompaniment of continuous booing by the fans. Aaron then scored on a Dodger error, and the run broke Willie Mays' all-time National League record for runs scored with 2,063. In the 4th inning, Aaron hit career home run number 715 off Downing. Although Dodgers outfielder Bill Buckner nearly went over the outfield wall trying to catch it, the ball landed in the Braves bullpen, where relief pitcher Tom House caught it. Two white college students sprinted onto the field and jogged alongside Aaron as he circled the base paths. As the fans cheered wildly, Aaron's mother ran onto the field as well.

Season standings

Record vs. opponents

Opening Day starters 
 Hank Aaron
 Dusty Baker
 Vic Correll
 Darrell Evans
 Ralph Garr
 Davey Johnson
 Mike Lum
 Ron Reed
 Craig Robinson

Notable transactions 
 June 5, 1974: Dale Murphy was drafted by the Braves in the 1st round (5th pick) of the 1974 Major League Baseball Draft.
 June 12, 1974: Dave Campbell was signed as an amateur free agent by the Braves.

Managerial turnover
While the crowning of Aaron as baseball's all-time home run king made 1974 an exceptional season for the Braves, the strong performance of the team on the field also marked the campaign.

But a mid-season slump cost manager Eddie Mathews—for years Aaron's fellow-superstar with the Milwaukee Braves of the 1950s—his job on July 21 during the All-Star break with the club at 50–49 (and 14 games out of first place).  Special assistant to the general manager Clyde King, 50, former skipper of the San Francisco Giants, assumed the managerial reins July 24.

King's hiring aroused some controversy when Aaron noted that he had been bypassed as a managerial candidate; he would have become baseball's first African-American manager had he been named to the post. He would have taken the Braves' job, Aaron said, "simply because there are no black managers in baseball." Braves' owner William Bartholomay responded by claiming he had had no inkling that Aaron was interested in managing in the Major Leagues.

As events turned out, however, the Braves responded to King, winning 38 of their final 63 games (.603) and King was rehired for the 1975 season. Frank Robinson became MLB's first black manager when he was hired by the Cleveland Indians on October 3, 1974.  Aaron was traded to the American League Milwaukee Brewers on November 2, 1974; he finished his active career in the Junior Circuit with two years as a designated hitter before returning to the Braves as a front-office executive.  Meanwhile, Mathews finished his managerial career with a 149–161 (.481) record over all or parts of three seasons.

Roster

Player stats

Batting

Starters by position 
Note: Pos = Position; G = Games played; AB = At bats; H = Hits; Avg. = Batting average; HR = Home runs; RBI = Runs batted in

Other batters 
Note: G = Games played; AB = At bats; H = Hits; Avg. = Batting average; HR = Home runs; RBI = Runs batted in

Pitching

Starting pitchers 
Note: G = Games pitched; IP = Innings pitched; W = Wins; L = Losses; ERA = Earned run average; SO = Strikeouts

Other pitchers 
Note: G = Games pitched; IP = Innings pitched; W = Wins; L = Losses: ERA = Earned run average; SO = Strikeouts

Relief pitchers 
Note: G = Games pitched; W = Wins; L = Losses; SV = Saves; ERA = Earned run average; SO = Strikeouts

Awards and honors

All-Stars 
1974 Major League Baseball All-Star Game
Hank Aaron, right field, starter
Buzz Capra, reserve
Ralph Garr, reserve

Farm system

Notes

References 

 1974 Atlanta Braves team page at Baseball Reference
 1974 Atlanta Braves team page at www.baseball-almanac.com
 

Atlanta Braves seasons
Atlanta Braves season
Atlanta